Salem Baptist Church is located at 3131 Lake Street in North Omaha, Nebraska, United States. Founded in 1922, it has played important roles in the history of African Americans in Omaha, and in the city's religious community. Church leadership has impacted the city in a variety of ways, with long-time pastor Rev. J.C. Wade being recognized in the Congressional Record in 2000, and having an area post office named after him.

See also
 History of North Omaha, Nebraska
 African Americans in Omaha, Nebraska
 Racial tension in Omaha, Nebraska

References

External links
 Salem Baptist Church website
 Salem Stepping Saints website
 Photo of the modern church

Landmarks in North Omaha, Nebraska
History of North Omaha, Nebraska
Baptist churches in Nebraska
Churches in Omaha, Nebraska
African-American history in Omaha, Nebraska
1922 establishments in Nebraska
20th-century Baptist churches in the United States
Clarence W. Wigington church buildings